Żurawiniec may refer to the following places in Poland:
Żurawiniec, Lower Silesian Voivodeship (south-west Poland)
Żurawiniec, Lublin Voivodeship (east Poland)
Żurawiniec, Greater Poland Voivodeship (west-central Poland)